Andi Alfian Mallarangeng (born March 14, 1963 in Makassar, South Sulawesi) is an Indonesian politician who served as Minister of Youth and Sports at Second United Indonesia Cabinet. He also served as presidential spokesman for President Susilo Bambang Yudhoyono. In 2012, he resigned as minister due to corruption charges against him.

Political career 
His involvement in the reform movement continued when he was a member of the General Elections Commission (KPU), the representative of the government, which organized the first democratic elections in 1999. With the establishment of the Ministry of Regional Autonomy in the reform era, Andi resigned from the KPU and joined as an expert staff of Ministers Country of Autonomy Region (1999–2000). The ministry was later dissolved despite being only 10 months old. He then worked on developing the idea of good governance as the Chair of Policy Committee on Partnership for Governance Reform (2000–2002). He had founded the Democratic Nationhood Party (Partai Persatuan Demokrasi Kebangsaan) with Ryaas Rasyid in 2002.

Andi quit being a lecturer in October 2004 when he was appointed Presidential Spokesperson by President Susilo Bambang Yudhoyono.

On December 7, 2012, he officially resigned his post as Minister of Youth and Sports of the Republic of Indonesia after he was listed as a suspect in a graft case related to the construction of the Hambalang sports complex in Sentul, Bogor, West Java by the Corruption Eradication Commission (KPK). On January 11, 2013 President Susilo Bambang Yudhoyono appointed Roy Suryo as the new Youth and Sports minister. On October 17, he was officially detained in the detention center Corruption Eradication Commission. Andi was officially detained after nearly a year of investigation.

He was sentenced to four years in prison and ordered to pay Rp 200 million. On April 21, 2017, he was released, though he is still expected to report to Sukamiskin Penitentiary.

References 

1963 births
People from Makassar
Indonesian politicians
Living people
Indonesian politicians convicted of corruption